In the .NET Framework, an assembly manifest is a text file containing metadata about the code within a CLI assembly. It describes the relationship and dependencies of the components in the assembly, versioning information, scope information and the security permissions required by the assembly.

The manifest information embedded within an assembly can be viewed using IL Disassembler (ILDASM.exe) which is available as part of Microsoft Windows SDK.

External links
Assembly Manifest at MSDN

Common Language Infrastructure